Samuel B. Ludlow (born 1792, New York State; died April 12, 1882, Oswego, New York) was an American jurist.  He was one of the first lawyers in Nassau, New York, and was a corporation officer when Nassau was chartered, and was town clerk in 1835.  He also played a role in the founding of the Nassau Academy.

From 1840 to 1845 he was a judge on the Oswego County Court of Common Pleas, and in 1841, he was named a First Judge on that court.  He is listed as a retired lawyer in Oswego in the 1880 U.S. Census.

See also
 Henry G. Ludlow was Samuel's brother.
 William Curtis Noyes got his legal training as a teenager in Samuel's Albany office.

1792 births
1882 deaths
People from Oswego County, New York
New York (state) state court judges